Believe is the second studio album by Australian guitarist Orianthi and her debut album recorded for a major label. It was released on 26 October 2009 by Geffen Records. The album's release was pushed back by Geffen to coincide with the compilation album This Is It by Michael Jackson, as a result of the publicity generated from her appearance in the concert film of the same name. The album peaked at number 77 at the Billboard 200.

The song "Believe" from which the album is titled, is a cover of the Niels Brinck's song "Believe Again", best known as the Danish entry for the Eurovision Song Contest 2009. Virtuoso guitarist Steve Vai appears on and co-wrote the song "Highly Strung". "Suffocated", a cover of a song by American band Sound the Alarm, appears on the soundtrack of music video game Guitar Hero: Warriors of Rock.

The album was re-released on 8 June 2010. Several tracks from Believe are remixed ("Bad News", "Think Like a Man", and "What's It Gonna Be"), while God Only Knows, Untogether, and Drive Away are omitted. It also includes four new songs, including the album's second single "Shut Up and Kiss Me".

Track listing
All songs were produced by Howard Benson, except for track 17.
(Catalogue: 2724713)

 Bonus tracks

Believe (II)
All songs produced by Howard Benson, except track 12 produced by RedOne.

Singles
 "According to You" is the debut single off the album. The music video for the single was directed by Marc Klasfeld. The song became a radio hit and commercial success in her local country Australia by reaching number 8 on the ARIA Charts. The song quickly gained popularity in the US, and peaked at number 17 on the Hot 100 and number 1 on American Top 40.

Personnel
 Orianthi – guitar, vocals
 Steve Vai – guitar
 Phil X – guitar
 Brian Chiusano – guitar
 Tal Herzberg – bass, engineer, executive producer, A&R
 Paul Bushnell – bass
 Chris Chaney – bass
 Frank Zummo – drums
 Josh Freese – drums
 Michito Sánchez – percussion
 Howard Benson – keyboards, programming, producer
 Kim Ballard – keyboards, programming

Production
 Simon Fuller – executive producer, A&R, management
 Stirling McIlwaine – executive producer, A&R, management
 Ron Fair – executive producer, A&R
 Mike Plotnikoff – engineer
 Hatsukazu "Hatch" Inagaki – engineer
 Ryan Shanahan – assistant engineer
 Jimmy Fahey – assistant engineer
 Paul DeCarli – digital editing
 Brad Townsend – mixing
 Andrew Schubert – mixing
 Chris Lord-Alge – mixing
 Keith Armstrong – mixing assistant
 Nik Karpen – mixing assistant
 Ted Jensen – mastering
 Chapman Baehler – photography
 Marc VanGool – guitar, guitar technician
 Jon Nicholson – drum technician
 Keki Mingus – creative director
 Buffy Hubelbank – A&R
 Cliff Feiman – production supervisor

Chart performance

Certifications

Release history

References

2009 albums 
19 Recordings albums
Albums produced by Howard Benson
Albums produced by RedOne
Albums produced by Ron Fair
Geffen Records albums
Orianthi albums